The 1985 Scottish League Cup final was played on 27 October 1985, at Hampden Park in Glasgow and was the final of the 40th Scottish League Cup competition. The final was contested by Aberdeen and Hibernian. Aberdeen won the match 3–0 thanks to goals by Eric Black (2) and Billy Stark, giving Alex Ferguson his only Scottish League Cup trophy win.

Match details

References

External links 
 Soccerbase

1985
League Cup Final
Scottish League Cup Final 1985
Scottish League Cup Final 1985
20th century in Glasgow